The 2016–17 Departmental One Day Cup was a List A cricket tournament in Pakistan. The competition ran from 17 December 2016 to 2 January 2017. The final was played between Sui Southern Gas Corporation and Habib Bank Limited, with Habib Bank Limited winning the match by 5 wickets.

Teams
The following teams competed:

 Habib Bank Limited
 Khan Research Laboratories
 National Bank of Pakistan
 Pakistan International Airlines
 Sui Northern Gas Pipelines Limited
 Sui Southern Gas Corporation
 United Bank Limited
 Water and Power Development Authority

Points table

 Teams qualified for the finals

Fixtures

Round-robin

Finals

References

External links
 Series home at ESPN Cricinfo

2016 in Pakistani cricket
2017 in Pakistani cricket
Domestic cricket competitions in 2016–17
2016-17 Departmental One Day Cup